Paul R. Alexander (September 3, 1937 – June 14, 2021) was an American commercial artist and illustrator. In a career spanning the years 1976–1998, he specialized in art for the covers of science fiction paperbacks and occasionally magazines. He was usually credited as Paul Alexander, but occasionally as Paul R. Alexander.

Life and career
Alexander was born September 3, 1937 in Richmond, Wayne County, Indiana, the son of Fred and Ora Olive Alexander. He graduated from Wittenburg University, Springfield, Ohio in 1967, and also studied at the Art Center College of Design, Los Angeles. He was "one of the top science fiction paperback cover artists of the 1970s and '80s." His career as a commercial artist on the East Coast spanned the years 1976–1998. He was also a model train collector. Alexander died June 14, 2021 at the Brethren Retirement Community, Greenville, Ohio. He was survived by a brother and sister-in-law, niece, and nephew.

Reception
Vincent Di Fate, fellow science fiction illustrator and a historian of the field, grouped Alexander together with Dean Ellis, Christopher Foss and John C. Berkey as "gadget" artists, "adept at painting futuristic hardware."

Notes

1937 births
2021 deaths
American illustrators
American speculative fiction artists
Science fiction artists
People from Richmond, Indiana
Wittenberg University alumni
Art Center College of Design alumni